Sophie Grégoire Trudeau (born April 24, 1975), also known as Sophie Grégoire, is a Canadian retired television host. She is married to the 23rd Prime Minister of Canada, Justin Trudeau. She is involved in charity work, social work, and public speaking, focusing mainly on the environment, women's issues, and children's issues. She was a "WE ambassador" for the WE Charity, which fell into scandal in 2020.

Early life and education
Grégoire was born on April 24, 1975, in Montreal, Quebec, as the only child of Jean Grégoire, a stockbroker, and Estelle Blais, a Franco-Ontarian nurse. Her family lived north of the city, in Sainte-Adèle, eventually relocating to Montreal when she was four years old. She was raised thereafter in Montreal's Mount Royal suburb, where she was a classmate and childhood friend of Michel Trudeau, the youngest son of Prime Minister Pierre Trudeau and his wife Margaret and brother of Grégoire's future husband, Justin Trudeau.

Grégoire has stated that her "childhood was a happy one", noting that she was a good student who made friends easily and loved sports and the outdoors. However, beginning around the age of 17, she struggled with bulimia nervosa. The problem lasted into her early 20s, when she revealed the illness to her parents and subsequently began a two-year period of recovery. She credits therapy, the support of her loved ones, and yoga with her recovery from the illness.

Grégoire attended high school at the private Pensionnat du Saint-Nom-de-Marie in Outremont. She subsequently attended the Collège Jean-de-Brébeuf before studying commerce at McGill University, intending to follow her father's career path, but soon switched to communications studies, and ultimately graduated with a Bachelor of Arts degree in communications from the Université de Montréal.

Career and charity work

Grégoire's first job was as a receptionist and assistant at an advertising firm. She was promoted to an account manager, but after three years of working in advertising, public relations, and sales, she decided to attend radio and television school, where she immediately knew, "I had found my calling". After completing her studies there, Grégoire got a job in a newsroom, writing the news ticker. A lover of culture, arts, and films, when she became aware of an opening at Quebec television station LCN for an entertainment reporter, she applied and was successful in obtaining the position. In addition to serving as an entertainment reporter for LCN's daily Showbiz segment, she contributed to segments on Salut, Bonjour!, Clin d'œil, and Bec et Museau for TVA, and hosted Canal Évasion's Escales de Rêves and Canal Z's Teksho. Grégoire also served as co-host on CKMF-FM Radio's morning shows and contributed to Radio-Canada's Coup de Pouce. Additionally, she worked in the mid-2000s as a personal shopper for upscale department store Holt Renfrew.

eTalk
In 2005, Grégoire attended a charity function where she met several CTV Television Network employees. This led to her being hired in September 2005 as a reporter for eTalk, CTV's Canadian entertainment news show. She served until 2010 as eTalk'''s Quebec correspondent, and focused her reporting on the philanthropy and activism of celebrities.

 Charity 
Grégoire is actively involved in charity work, volunteering for several Canadian charities and non-profit organizations.

As part of her work with WaterCan, Grégoire travelled to Ethiopia in October 2006 with her mother-in-law, Margaret Trudeau, who is the honorary president of the organization. Their trip was featured in a CTV documentary, "A Window Opens: Margaret and Sophie in Ethiopia", which aired in May 2007.

Grégoire is the national ambassador for Plan Canada's "Because I am a Girl" initiative, and the official spokesperson for The Shield of Athena, which helps women and children dealing with domestic violence. 
Grégoire also works as a professional public speaker, focusing primarily on women's issues.

Personal life

Grégoire first met Justin Trudeau, the eldest son of Prime Minister Pierre Trudeau, when they were both growing up in Montreal, where Grégoire was a classmate and childhood friend of the youngest Trudeau son, Michel. Grégoire and Trudeau reconnected as adults in June 2003, when they were assigned to co-host a charity ball, and began dating several months later. They became engaged in October 2004, and married on May 28, 2005, in a ceremony at Montreal's Sainte-Madeleine d'Outremont Church. They have three children: Xavier James born in 2007, Ella-Grace Margaret born in 2009, and Hadrien Gregoire born in 2014.

Grégoire is reported to have introduced her brother-in-law Alexandre to his future wife Zoë Bedos.

After her husband became a Member of Parliament for Montreal's Papineau riding in 2008, Grégoire continued to live in their Montreal home with their children, while Trudeau stayed at a hotel in Ottawa during the week. In June 2013, two months after Trudeau became the leader of the Liberal Party of Canada, the couple sold their home in Montreal's Côte-des-Neiges neighbourhood and began living in a rented home in the Rockcliffe Park area of Ottawa.

Grégoire Trudeau's husband Justin Trudeau was officially sworn in as the Prime Minister of Canada on November 4, 2015. After the end of the 2015 election, Grégoire Trudeau indicated her preference for the hyphenated surname of "Grégoire-Trudeau", but she switched to using the unhyphenated form in March 2016.

Grégoire is fluent in French, English, and Spanish. She became a certified yoga instructor in 2012.

On March 12, 2020, Grégoire isolated herself at Rideau Cottage, along with her husband and children, after she showed flu-like symptoms during the COVID-19 pandemic, shortly after she returned from a speaking engagement in the United Kingdom. The Prime Minister's Office announced later that day that she had tested positive for COVID-19. By March 28, she had recovered.

 "Smile Back at Me" 
On January 18, 2016, Grégoire Trudeau made the impromptu decision to sing a work she composed, titled "Smile Back at Me" at the end of a speech in honour of Martin Luther King Jr. Day at Ottawa City Hall. Mike Strobel, of the Toronto Sun, said the crowd gave her a standing ovation. Toronto Star pop music critic Ben Rayner said the song was "out of pitch" and "cast serious doubt upon her musical judgment". In Maclean's'', Michael Barclay (formerly a music critic), described the song as "fine", although not designed to be sung a capella, and that Grégoire's voice was "surprisingly strong". Remixed versions of the song were released online afterward. Several commenters felt the song was out of place at a memorial to a black civil rights leader, and also noted the general lack of black leaders being depicted or included in the event itself.  Some commenters noted that she did have training previously in various musical arts.

References

1975 births
Canadian people of French descent
Canadian infotainers
Canadian Roman Catholics
Canadian journalists
Canadian social workers
Canadian television hosts
Canadian women television hosts
Canadian environmentalists
Canadian feminists
Ecofeminists
French Quebecers
Living people
People from Mount Royal, Quebec
Spouses of prime ministers of Canada
Trudeau political family
Université de Montréal alumni
Philanthropists from Quebec
Justin Trudeau
CTV Television Network people
People from Laurentides